Bentley High School is located in Burton, Michigan. Serving students from the 9th grade to the 12th grade, it is part of the Bentley Community Schools. The high school offers programs in band, music, drama, and sports (with a team name of "the Bentley Bulldogs"), as well as other programs.

References

External links
Official site
MI School Data - Parent Dashboard for School Transparency

Public high schools in Michigan
Schools in Genesee County, Michigan